Matthew Duncan Catley (born 11 February 1975) is a former English cricketer.  Catley was a right-handed batsman who bowled both leg break and right-arm medium pace.  He was born in Huntingdon, Cambridgeshire.

Catley made his debut for Suffolk in the 1999 Minor Counties Championship against Bedfordshire.  Catley played Minor counties cricket for Suffolk from 1999 to 2003, which included 12 Minor Counties Championship appearances and 8 MCCA Knockout Trophy matches.  He made his List A debut against Lincolnshire in the 1st round of the 2001 Cheltenham & Gloucester Trophy.  He made 2 further List A appearances, against the Essex Cricket Board in the 2nd round of same competition, and Buckinghamshire in the 1st round of the 2003 Cheltenham & Gloucester Trophy, which was held in 2002.  In his 3 List A matches, he scored 15 runs at an average of 7.50, with a high score of 9.

His brothers, Russell and Timothy, both played List A and Minor counties cricket for Suffolk.

References

External links
Matthew Catley at ESPNcricinfo
Matthew Catley at CricketArchive

1975 births
Living people
People from Huntingdon
English cricketers
Suffolk cricketers